The 2019–20 Liga IV Botoșani (known as Liga IV Givova for sponsorship reasons) was the 52nd season of the Liga IV Botoșani, the fourth tier of the Romanian football league system. The season began on 18 August 2019 and was scheduled to end in June 2020, but was suspended in March because of the COVID-19 pandemic in Romania.

Dante Botoșani was declared the county champion and the representative of Botoșani County at the promotion play-off to Liga III.

Team changes 
14 teams compete in this season: the top 12 teams from the previous season and two promoted teams from the Liga V Botoșani.

Viitorul Albești, champions of previous season, lost the promotion playoff against CSM Bacău from Bacău County and it will stay in Liga IV Botoșani.

To Liga IV Botoșani
Promoted from Liga V Botoșani
 Independentul Darabani
 Dante Botoșani

From Liga IV Botoșani

Relegated to Liga V Botoșani
 Europa Hilișeu

League table

Promotion play-off

Champions of Liga IV – Botoșani County face champions of Liga IV – Bacău County and Liga IV – Vaslui County.

Region 1 (North–East)

Group B

See also

Main Leagues
 2019–20 Liga I
 2019–20 Liga II
 2019–20 Liga III
 2019–20 Liga IV

County Leagues (Liga IV series)

 2019–20 Liga IV Alba
 2019–20 Liga IV Arad
 2019–20 Liga IV Argeș
 2019–20 Liga IV Bacău
 2019–20 Liga IV Bihor
 2019–20 Liga IV Bistrița-Năsăud
 2019–20 Liga IV Brăila
 2019–20 Liga IV Brașov
 2019–20 Liga IV Bucharest
 2019–20 Liga IV Buzău
 2019–20 Liga IV Călărași
 2019–20 Liga IV Caraș-Severin
 2019–20 Liga IV Cluj
 2019–20 Liga IV Constanța
 2019–20 Liga IV Covasna
 2019–20 Liga IV Dâmbovița
 2019–20 Liga IV Dolj
 2019–20 Liga IV Galați
 2019–20 Liga IV Giurgiu
 2019–20 Liga IV Gorj
 2019–20 Liga IV Harghita
 2019–20 Liga IV Hunedoara
 2019–20 Liga IV Ialomița
 2019–20 Liga IV Iași
 2019–20 Liga IV Ilfov
 2019–20 Liga IV Maramureș
 2019–20 Liga IV Mehedinți
 2019–20 Liga IV Mureș
 2019–20 Liga IV Neamț
 2019–20 Liga IV Olt
 2019–20 Liga IV Prahova
 2019–20 Liga IV Sălaj
 2019–20 Liga IV Satu Mare
 2019–20 Liga IV Sibiu
 2019–20 Liga IV Suceava
 2019–20 Liga IV Teleorman
 2019–20 Liga IV Timiș
 2019–20 Liga IV Tulcea
 2019–20 Liga IV Vâlcea
 2019–20 Liga IV Vaslui
 2019–20 Liga IV Vrancea

References

External links
 AJF Botoșani 

Liga IV seasons
Sport in Botoșani County